Address geocoding, or simply geocoding, is the process of taking a text-based description of a location, such as an address or the name of a place, and returning geographic coordinates, frequently latitude/longitude pair, to identify a location on the Earth's surface. Reverse geocoding, on the other hand, converts geographic coordinates to a description of a location, usually the name of a place or an addressable location. Geocoding relies on a computer representation of address points, the street / road network, together with postal and administrative boundaries.

 Geocode (verb): provide geographical coordinates corresponding to (a location).
 Geocode (noun):  is a code that represents a geographic entity (location or object).In general is a  human-readable and short identifier; like a nominal-geocode as ISO 3166-1 alpha-2, or a grid-geocode, as Geohash geocode.
 Geocoder (noun): a piece of software or a (web) service that implements a geocoding process i.e. a set of interrelated components in the form of operations, algorithms, and data sources that work together to produce a spatial representation for descriptive locational references.

The geographic coordinates representing locations often vary greatly in positional accuracy. Examples include building centroids, land parcel centroids, interpolated locations based on thoroughfare ranges, street segments centroids, postal code centroids (e.g.  ZIP codes, CEDEX), and Administrative division Centroids.

History 
Geocoding – a subset of Geographic Information System (GIS) spatial analysis – has been a subject of interest since the early 1960s.

1960s 
In 1960, the first operational GIS –  named the Canada Geographic Information System (CGIS) – was invented by Dr. Roger Tomlinson, who has since been acknowledged as the father of GIS. The CGIS was used to store and analyze data collected for the Canada Land Inventory, which mapped information about agriculture, wildlife, and forestry at a scale of 1:50,000, in order to regulate land capability for rural Canada. However, the CGIS lasted until the 1990s and was never available commercially.

On 1 July 1963, five-digit ZIP codes were introduced nationwide by the United States Post Office Department (USPOD). In 1983, nine-digit ZIP+4 codes were brought about as an extra identifier in more accurately locating addresses.

In 1964, the Harvard Laboratory for Computer Graphics and Spatial Analysis developed groundbreaking software code – e.g. GRID, and SYMAP – all of which were sources for commercial development of GIS.

In 1967, a team at the Census Bureau – including the mathematician James Corbett and Donald Cooke – invented Dual Independent Map Encoding (DIME) – the first modern vector mapping model – which ciphered address ranges into street network files and incorporated the "percent along" geocoding algorithm. Still in use by platforms such as Google Maps and MapQuest, the "percent along" algorithm denotes where a matched address is located along a reference feature as a percentage of the reference feature's total length. DIME was intended for the use of the United States Census Bureau, and it involved accurately mapping block faces, digitizing nodes representing street intersections, and forming spatial relationships. New Haven, Connecticut, was the first city on Earth with a geocodable streets network database.

1980s 
In the late 1970s, two main public domain geocoding platforms were in development: GRASS GIS and MOSS. The early 1980s saw the rise of many more commercial vendors of geocoding software, namely Intergraph, ESRI, CARIS, ERDAS, and MapInfo Corporation. These platforms merged the 1960s approach of separating spatial information with the approach of organizing this spatial information into database structures.

In 1986, Mapping Display and Analysis System (MIDAS) became the first desktop geocoding software, designed for the DOS operating system. Geocoding was elevated from the research department into the business world with the acquisition of MIDAS by MapInfo. MapInfo has since been acquired by Pitney Bowes, and has pioneered in merging geocoding with business intelligence; allowing location intelligence to provide solutions for the public and private sectors.

1990s 
The end of the 20th century had seen geocoding become more user-oriented, especially via open-source GIS software. Mapping applications and geospatial data had become more accessible over the Internet.

Because the mail-out/mail-back technique was so successful in the 1980 Census, the U.S. Bureau of Census was able to put together a large geospatial database, using interpolated street geocoding. This database – along with the Census' nationwide coverage of households – allowed for the birth of TIGER (Topologically Integrated Geographic Encoding and Referencing).

Containing address ranges instead of individual addresses, TIGER has since been implemented in nearly all geocoding software platforms used today. By the end of the 1990 Census, TIGER "contained a latitude/longitude-coordinate for more than 30 million feature intersections and endpoints and nearly 145 million feature 'shape' points that defined the more than 42 million feature segments that outlined more than 12 million polygons."

TIGER was the breakthrough for "big data" geospatial solutions.

2000s 
The early 2000s saw the rise of Coding Accuracy Support System (CASS) address standardization. The CASS certification is offered to all software vendors and advertising mailers who want the United States Postal Services (USPS) to assess the quality of their address-standardizing software. The annually renewed CASS certification is based on delivery point codes, ZIP codes, and ZIP+4 codes. Adoption of a CASS certified software by software vendors allows them to receive discounts in bulk mailing and shipping costs. They can benefit from increased accuracy and efficiency in those bulk mailings, after having a certified database. In the early 2000s, geocoding platforms were also able to support multiple datasets.

In 2003, geocoding platforms were capable of merging postal codes with street data, updated monthly. This process became known as "conflation".

Beginning in 2005, geocoding platforms included parcel-centroid geocoding. Parcel-centroid geocoding allowed for a lot of precision in geocoding an address. For example, parcel-centroid allowed a geocoder to determine the centroid of a specific building or lot of land. Platforms were now also able to determine the elevation of specific parcels.

2005 also saw the introduction of the Assessor's Parcel Number (APN). A jurisdiction's tax assessor was able to assign this number to parcels of real estate. This allowed for proper identification and record-keeping. An APN is important for geocoding an area which is covered by a gas or oil lease, and indexing property tax information provided to the public.

In 2006, Reverse Geocoding and reverse APN lookup were introduced to geocoding platforms. This involved geocoding a numerical point location – with a longitude and latitude – to a textual, readable address.

2008 and 2009 saw the growth of interactive, user-oriented geocoding platforms – namely MapQuest, Google Maps, Bing Maps, and Global Positioning Systems (GPS). These platforms were made even more accessible to the public with the simultaneous growth of the mobile industry, specifically smartphones.

2010s 
The 2010s saw vendors fully support geocoding and reverse geocoding globally. Cloud-based geocoding application programming interface (API) and on-premises geocoding have allowed for a greater match rate, greater precision, and greater speed. There is now a popularity in the idea of geocoding being able to influence business decisions. This is the integration between the geocoding process and business intelligence.

The future of geocoding also involves three-dimensional geocoding, indoor geocoding, and multiple language returns for the geocoding platforms.

Geocoding process 
Geocoding is a task which involves multiple datasets and processes, all of which work together. A geocoder is made of two important components: a reference dataset and the geocoding algorithm. Each of these components are made up of sub-operations and sub-components. Without understanding how these geocoding processes work, it is difficult to make informed business decisions based on geocoding.

Input data 
Input data are the descriptive, textual information (address or building name) which the user wants to turn into numerical, spatial data (latitude and longitude) – through the process of geocoding.

Classification of input data 
Input data is classified into two categories: relative input data and absolute input data.

Relative input data 
Relative input data are the textual descriptions of a location which, alone, cannot output a spatial representation of that location. Such data outputs a relative geocode, which is dependent and geographically relative of other reference locations. An example of a relative geocode is address-interpolation using areal units or line vectors. "Across the street from the Empire State Building" is an example of a relative input data. The location being sought cannot be determined without identifying the Empire State Building. Geocoding platforms often do not support such relative locations, but advances are being made in this direction.

Absolute input data 
Absolute input data are the textual descriptions of a location which, alone, can output a spatial representation of that location. This data type outputs an absolute known location independently of other locations. For example, USPS ZIP codes; USPS ZIP+4 codes; complete and partial postal addresses; USPS PO boxes; rural routes; cities; counties; intersections; and named places can all be referenced in a data source absolutely.

When there is a lot of variability in the way addresses can be represented – such as too much input data or too little input data – geocoders use address normalization and address standardization in order to resolve this problem.

Address interpolation
A simple method of geocoding is address interpolation.  This method makes use of data from a street geographic information system where the street network is already mapped within the geographic coordinate space.  Each street segment is attributed with address ranges (e.g. house numbers from one segment to the next).  Geocoding takes an address, matches it to a street and specific segment (such as a block, in towns that use the "block" convention). Geocoding then interpolates the position of the address, within the range along the segment.

Example
Take for example: 742 Evergreen Terrace

Let's say that this segment (for instance, a block) of Evergreen Terrace runs from 700 to 799.  Even-numbered addresses fall on the east side of Evergreen Terrace, with odd-numbered addresses on the west side of the street.  742 Evergreen Terrace would (probably) be located slightly less than halfway up the block, on the east side of the street.  A point would be mapped at that location along the street, perhaps offset a distance to the east of the street centerline.

Complicating factors 

However, this process is not always as straightforward as in this example.
Difficulties arise when
 distinguishing between ambiguous addresses such as 742 Evergreen Terrace and 742 W Evergreen Terrace.
 attempting to geocode new addresses for a street that is not yet added to the geographic information system database.
While there might be a 742 Evergreen Terrace in Springfield, there might also be a 742 Evergreen Terrace in Shelbyville.  Asking for the city name (and state, province, country, etc. as needed) can solve this problem. Boston, Massachusetts has multiple "100 Washington Street" locations because several cities have been annexed without changing street names, thus requiring use of unique postal codes or district names for disambiguation.
Geocoding accuracy can be greatly improved by first utilizing good address verification practices.  Address verification will confirm the existence of the address and will eliminate ambiguities.  Once the valid address is determined, it is very easy to geocode and determine the latitude/longitude coordinates.
Finally, several caveats on using interpolation:
 The typical attribution of a street segment assumes that all even numbered parcels are on one side of the segment, and all odd numbered parcels are on the other. This is often not true in real life.
 Interpolation assumes that the given parcels are evenly distributed along the length of the segment. This is almost never true in real life; it is not uncommon for a geocoded address to be off by several thousand feet.
 Interpolation also assumes that the street is straight.  If a street is curved then the geocoded location will not necessarily fit the physical location of the address.
 Segment Information (esp. from sources such as TIGER) includes a maximum upper bound for addresses and is interpolated as though the full address range is used.  For example, a segment (block) might have a listed range of 100–199, but the last address at the end of the block is 110.  In this case, address 110 would be geocoded to 10% of the distance down the segment rather than near the end.
 Most interpolation implementations will produce a point as their resulting address location. In reality, the physical address is distributed along the length of the segment, i.e. consider geocoding the address of a shopping mall – the physical lot may run a distance along the street segment (or could be thought of as a two-dimensional space-filling polygon which may front on several different streets — or worse, for cities with multi-level streets, a three-dimensional shape that meets different streets at several different levels) but the interpolation treats it as a singularity.

A very common error is to believe the accuracy ratings of a given map's geocodable attributes.  Such accuracy as quoted by vendors has no bearing on an address being attributed to the correct segment or to the correct side of the segment, nor resulting in an accurate position along that correct segment.  With the geocoding process used for U.S. Census TIGER datasets, 5–7.5% of the addresses may be allocated to a different census tract, while a study of Australia's TIGER-like system found that 50% of the geocoded points were mapped to the wrong property parcel.
The accuracy of geocoded data can also have a bearing on the quality of research that uses this data.  One study by a group of Iowa researchers found that the common method of geocoding using TIGER datasets as described above, can cause a loss of as much as 40% of the power of a statistical analysis.  An alternative is to use orthophoto or image coded data such as the Address Point data from Ordnance Survey in the UK, but such datasets are generally expensive.

Because of this, it is quite important to avoid using interpolated results except for non-critical applications.  Interpolated geocoding is usually not appropriate for making authoritative decisions, for example if life safety will be affected by that decision.  Emergency services, for example, do not make an authoritative decision based on their interpolations; an ambulance or fire truck will always be dispatched regardless of what the map says.

Other techniques
In rural areas or other places lacking high quality street network data and addressing, GPS is useful for mapping a location.  For traffic accidents, geocoding to a street intersection or midpoint along a street centerline is a suitable technique.  Most highways in developed countries have mile markers to aid in emergency response, maintenance, and navigation.  It is also possible to use a combination of these geocoding techniques — using a particular technique for certain cases and situations and other techniques for other cases.
In contrast to geocoding of structured postal address records, toponym resolution maps place names in unstructured document collections to their corresponding spatial footprints.

 Place codes offer a way to create digitally generated addresses where no information exists using satellite imagery and machine learning, e.g., Robocodes
 Natural Address Codes  are a proprietary geocode system that can address an area anywhere on the Earth, or a volume of space anywhere around the Earth. The use of  alphanumeric characters instead of only ten digits makes a NAC shorter than its numerical latitude/longitude equivalent.
 Military Grid Reference System is the geocoordinate standard used by NATO militaries for locating points on Earth.
 Universal Transverse Mercator coordinate system is a map projection system for assigning coordinates to locations on the surface of the Earth. 
 the Maidenhead Locator System, popular with radio operators.
 the World Geographic Reference System (GEOREF), developed for global military operations, replaced by the current Global Area Reference System (GARS).
 Open Location Code or "Plus Codes," developed by Google and released into the public domain.
 Geohash, a public domain system based on the Morton Z-order curve.
 What3words, a proprietary system that encodes GCS coordinates as pseudorandom sets of words by dividing the coordinates into three numbers and looking up words in an indexed dictionary.

Research
Research has introduced a new approach to the control and knowledge aspects of geocoding, by using an agent-based paradigm. In addition to the new paradigm for geocoding, additional correction techniques and control algorithms have been developed. The approach represents the geographic elements commonly found in addresses as individual agents. This provides a commonality and duality to control and geographic representation. In addition to scientific publication, the new approach and subsequent prototype gained national media coverage in Australia. The research was conducted at Curtin University in Perth, Western Australia.

With the recent advance in Deep Learning and Computer Vision, a new geocoding workflow, which leverages Object Detection techniques to directly extract the centroid of the building rooftops as geocoding output, has been proposed.

Uses
Geocoded locations are useful in many GIS analysis, cartography, decision making workflow, transaction mash-up, or injected into larger business processes. On the web, geocoding is used in services like routing and local search. Geocoding, along with GPS provides location data for geotagging media, such as photographs or RSS items.

Privacy concerns
The proliferation and ease of access to geocoding (and reverse-geocoding) services raises privacy concerns.  For example, in mapping crime incidents, law enforcement agencies aim to balance the privacy rights of victims and offenders, with the public's right to know.  Law enforcement agencies have experimented with alternative geocoding techniques that allow them to mask a portion of the locational detail (e.g., address specifics that would lead to identifying a victim or offender).  As well, in providing online crime mapping to the public, they also place disclaimers regarding the locational accuracy of points on the map, acknowledging these location masking techniques, and impose terms of use for the information.

See also
 Geocode
 Gazetteer
 Geocoded photo, which includes methods of geocoding images
 Geographic information system (GIS)
 Geolocation
 Geoparsing
 Georeference
 Geotagging
 Linear referencing
 Reverse geocoding
 Toponym resolution

References

External links 

 
 Three Standard Geocoding Methods (in North America) – article
 The Evolution of Geocoding: Moving Away from Conflation Confliction to Best Match – article
 A Flexible Addressing System for Approximate Geocoe best geocoding ding – paper presented at Geoinfo 2003
 The UCDP and AidData codebook on geo-referencing aid – guide for geocoding development aid projects

Geographic information systems